Hazboun (Arabic:حزبون) is the surname of a native Christian family from Bethlehem, a town in the West Bank (Palestine).

The Hazboun family's legendary history is said to have included ancestors from the royal family in Portugal that migrated to The Holy Land (Bethlehem, Palestine) during one of The Crusades.  Although the family name predates paper records, church records indicate that the common documented ancestor of the living family, was born in Ottoman Palestine in 1610, was called Sulaiman Hazboun.

The Hazboun family name originally comes from biblical Heshbon in central Jordan, now Hisban. The Hazboun name has evolved into different spelling variations due to the universal dispersal and relocation of families*: Hazboun, Hazboon, Hazbun, Hazbon, Hasbun, Hasboun, Hasbon, Àsbun, Jasbon, etc.  Currently, the family is found throughout the world, especially in all parts of the Americas and some parts of Europe and the Middle East. The Hazboun.org Hazboun.org website links all of these families together.

Notable people with the surname include:

Asbun 
 Carlos Asbun (born 1926), Bolivian  sports shooter.
 Juan Pereda Asbún (1931-2012), politician and former president of Bolivia
 Luis Liendo Asbún (born 1978), Chilean football player

Hasbún 

 Carlos Hasbún (born 1949), Salvadoran athlete.
 Hato Hasbún (1946-2017), politician from El Salvador
 Ignacio Hasbún (born 1990), Chilean footballer
 Rosa Hasbún (born 1952), Salvadoran former swimmer
 Sergio Hasbún (born 1947) Salvadoran former swimmer

Hazboun 

 Ibrahim Hazboun (born 1947), Palestinian astrologer
 George Hazboun (born 1945), Jordanian lawyer
 Sabine Hazboun (born 1994), Palestinian swimmer

References 

 1."A Legacy from the Heart of Bethlehem". Originally, this page was under Dabdoub.ps  which has now changed.  The information was Retrieved 2014-06-13.
 2. "Hazboun Family Origin Legend". www.hazboun.org.